The Panhandle Northern Railroad is a class III short-line railroad that operates 31 miles of track between Borger, Texas and Panhandle, Texas.  The line operates on former Atchison, Topeka and Santa Fe Railway trackage that was sold off in 1993.  It is owned by OmniTRAX.

Equipment

References

Switching and terminal railroads
Texas railroads